Hanna Jazmin Jaff Bosdet (born November 4, 1986) is an American-born Mexican television personality who runs the non-profit Jaff Foundation for Education. She has appeared in various media outlets and was part of the television series Made in Mexico.

Early life
Hanna Jaff was born in San Diego, California. She is a paternal descendant of the Jaff tribe and a maternal descendant of Carlos Henry Bosdet.

After completing high school from the University of San Diego High School, San Diego, Jaff completed a Bachelor of Arts degree in Psychology from the National University.

Career
In 2013-2018, Jaff held a number of political roles at the Institutional Revolutionary Party in Mexico, such as Undersecretary of Immigrants, Undersecretary of Relations with the Civil Society and of Revolutionary Youth Expression.

In 2013, Jaff founded the Jaff Foundation for Education, which she currently runs. The organization's goal is to improve education in Mexico through teaching the English language. To that end, Jaff has published English manuals and created scholarships, which the foundation donates to students. The foundation maintains offices in several states in Mexico.

Jaff has been a speaker at three TEDx Talks events in Mexico. 

In 2017, Jaff launched a clothing line with the name We Are One Campaign to show support for the victims of war in the Middle East.

In 2018, Netflix announced that Jaff would be one of the cast members of the television show Made in Mexico, which began airing on September 28, 2018.

Jaff has appeared in several Mexican media outlets, including Forbes 100 most powerful women in Mexico and Caras magazine.

In 2021, Jaff was named Kindness Ambassador for UNESCO MGEIP global campaign.

In 2022, she was an executive producer of animated movie: “Águila y Jaguar: Los Guerreros Legendarios”.

Personal life
Jaff married Harry Roper-Curzon in February 2020 and divorced two years later.

References

External links
 
 We Are One Campaign

1986 births
Living people
Actresses from San Diego
American television actresses
Mexican television actresses
Philanthropists from California
Mexican philanthropists
American emigrants to Mexico
American people of French descent
American people of Kurdish descent
American people of Iraqi descent
American people of Mexican descent
Mexican people of French descent
Mexican people of Kurdish descent
Mexican people of Iraqi descent
National University (California) alumni
Harvard University alumni
Columbia University alumni
Monterrey Institute of Technology and Higher Education alumni
Paris-Sorbonne University alumni